Burri is a surname. Notable people with the surname include:

 Alberto Burri (1915–1995), Italian abstract painter and sculptor
 Emil Burri (1902–1966), German playwright and screenwriter
 Franz Burri (1901–1987), Swiss political figure
 Hanspeter Burri (1963), retired Swiss footballer
 Olivier Burri (born 1963), Swiss rally driver
 Otto Burri (died 2015), Swiss rower
 René Burri (1933–2014), Swiss photographer
 René Burri (footballer) (born 1941), Swiss former footballer
 Reto Burri (born 1976), retired Swiss footballer

See also

 Buri (disambiguation)
 Burris (surname)
 Burry